North Passage Island is an island of the Andaman Islands. It belongs to the North and Middle Andaman administrative district, part of the Indian union territory of Andaman and Nicobar Islands.

Geography
The island belongs to the East Baratang Group and lies east of Baratang and Colebrooke Island.
The Cape Portman lighthouse, with a focal plane 29 m (95 ft); white flash every 5 s. This lighthouse marks the northern entrance to Diligent Strait. Located on a sharp cape at the northern tip of North Passage Island.

Administration
Politically, North Passage Island, along neighboring East Baratang Group, is part of Rangat Taluk.

Demographics 
There is only 1 village, located at Merk Bay. 
North Passage Island in Andaman and Nicobar has very diminutive history of habitation, other than erratic visits from different sects of the Great Andamanese. Just about 100 acres of land behind Merk Bay beach was handed over to the Agriculture Department of Andaman Islands four decades ago. This was done in order to set up a coconut plantation. The only inhabitants of this island at present are representatives of the Forest Department and caretakers of the Coconut Plantation.

References 

 Geological Survey of India

Cities and towns in North and Middle Andaman district
Islands of North and Middle Andaman district
Islands of India
Populated places in India
Islands of the Bay of Bengal